Edgar Britton  (1901-1982) was an American painter, muralist and sculptor born in Kearney, Nebraska. He moved to Chicago  where he studied and worked with Edgar Miller.  There he began painting murals, many as WPA  projects.

For reasons of his health he relocated to Colorado in the early 1940s where he  taught at the Colorado Springs Fine Arts Center until 1951.

Gallery

References

1901 births
1982 deaths
Modern painters
20th-century American painters
American male painters
American muralists
Artists from Colorado
Federal Art Project artists
People from Kearney, Nebraska
20th-century American male artists